Li Qian is the name of:

 Li Qian (politician) (born 1960), Chinese politician
 Li Qian (actress) (born 1984), Chinese actress
 Li Qian (rower) (born 1985), Chinese Olympic rower
 Li Qian (Polish table tennis) (born 1986), Chinese-Polish table tennis player
 Li Qian (Paralympic table tennis)
 Li Qian (boxer) (born 1990), Chinese boxer

See also
 Liqian, village in Gansu, China
 Li Qiang (disambiguation)